is a Japanese actress and voice actress from Tokyo. She is affiliated with the Bungaku Company. She is the official Japanese voice-dubbing artist for Kate Winslet, Gwyneth Paltrow, Kirsten Dunst and others. She is also the official Japanese dubbing roles for Milla Jovovich with TV editions in early days.

Filmography

Television animation
Ikki Tousen (Chinkyū Kōdai)
Marvel Anime: Iron Man (Pepper Potts)

Theatrical animation
Psycho-Pass: Sinners of the System (Kyōka Tsujichō)

Video games
Dark Cloud 2 (Elena)
Glass Rose (Tsuysko Sawamatsu)

Dubbing roles
Gwyneth Paltrow
The Anniversary Party (Skye Davidson)
Iron Man (Pepper Potts)
Iron Man 2 (Pepper Potts)
The Avengers (Pepper Potts)
Iron Man 3 (Pepper Potts)
Mortdecai (Johanna Mortdecai)
Spider-Man: Homecoming (Pepper Potts)
Avengers: Infinity War (Pepper Potts)
Kate Winslet
Titanic (2004 Fuji TV edition) (Rose DeWitt Bukater)
Finding Neverland (J.M. Barrie)
All the King's Men (Anne Stanton)
Little Children (Sarah Pierce)
The Reader (Hanna Schmitz)
Carnage (Nancy Cowan)
Divergent (Jeanine Matthews)
Christina Hendricks
ER (Joyce Westlake)
Mad Men (Joan Holloway)
Life as We Know It (Alison Novak)
I Don't Know How She Does It (Allison Henderson)
Diane Kruger
Troy (2007 TV Asahi edition) (Helen)
Copying Beethoven (Anna Holtz)
Forces spéciales (Elsa Casanova)
Unknown (Gina)
27 Dresses (Jane Nichols (Katherine Heigl))
8 Women (Catherine (Ludivine Sagnier))
The A-Team (Charissa Sosa (Jessica Biel))
Australia (Lady Sarah Ashley (Nicole Kidman))
Baby Mama (Kate Holbrook (Tina Fey))
The Big Wedding (Lyla Griffin (Katherine Heigl))
Birdman (Lesley Truman (Naomi Watts))
The Black Dahlia (Elizabeth Short (Mia Kirshner))
Blade Runner: The Final Cut (Rachael (Sean Young))
Broken Embraces (Magdalena "Lena" Rivas (Penélope Cruz))
Casanova (Francesca Bruni (Sienna Miller))
Casino Royale (Vesper Lynd (Eva Green))
The Change-Up (Sabrina McKay (Olivia Wilde))
Chicago Joe and the Showgirl (2009 DVD edition) (Joyce Cook (Patsy Kensit))
Click (Donna Newman (Kate Beckinsale))
Cliffhanger (2014 BS Japan edition) (Jessie Deighan (Janine Turner))
Constantine (2008 TV Asahi edition) (Angela Dodson (Rachel Weisz))
Cruel Intentions 3 (Cassidy Merteuil (Kristina Anapau))
Daredevil (Elektra Natchios (Jennifer Garner))
The Dark Knight (2012 TV Asahi edition) (Rachel Dawes (Maggie Gyllenhaal))
Diamonds Are Forever (2006 DVD/Blu-Ray edition) (Tiffany Case (Jill St. John))
The Diving Bell and the Butterfly (Henriette Durand (Marie-Josée Croze))
Dream House (Ann Patterson (Naomi Watts))
Elektra (Elektra (Jennifer Garner))
Exorcist: The Beginning (Sarah (Izabella Scorupco))
The Extraordinary Adventures of Adèle Blanc-Sec (Adèle Blanc-Sec (Louise Bourgoin))
Felon (Laura Porter (Marisol Nichols))
Five Fingers (Saadia (Touriya Haoud))
The Following (Claire Matthews (Natalie Zea))
Freddy vs. Jason (Lori Campbell (Monica Keena))
Gilmore Girls (Lorelai Gilmore (Lauren Graham))
The Guardian (Emily Thomas (Melissa Sagemiller))
The Happening (Alma Moore (Zooey Deschanel))
Hitman (Nika Boronina (Olga Kurylenko))
Home Sweet Hell (Mona Champagne (Katherine Heigl))
I'm Sorry, I Love You (Moon Ji-young (Choi Yeo-jin))
I, Robot (television edition) (Doctor Susan Calvin (Bridget Moynahan))
Identity (Paris Nevada (Amanda Peet))
Igby Goes Down (Rachel (Amanda Peet))
Imagine Me & You (Luce (Lena Headey))
The Impossible (Maria Bennett (Naomi Watts))
The International (Eleanor Whitman (Naomi Watts))
Interstellar (Murphy (Jessica Chastain))
The Italian Job (Stella Bridger (Charlize Theron))
Joint Security Area (Major Sophie E. Jean (Lee Young-ae))
Juno (Vanessa Loring (Jennifer Garner))
Knowing (Diana Wayland (Rose Byrne))
Lake Placid: The Final Chapter (Sheriff Theresa Glove (Elisabeth Röhm))
Lord of War (Ava Fontaine (Bridget Moynahan))
Max Payne (Natasha Sax (Olga Kurylenko))
Mission: Impossible III (Julia Meade (Michelle Monaghan))
Neighbors 2: Sorority Rising (Kelly Radner (Rose Byrne))
The Net 2.0 (Hope Cassidy (Nikki DeLoach))
Night Watch (Svetlana (Mariya Poroshina))
Noah (Naameh (Jennifer Connelly))
Nowhere Boy (Julia Lennon (Anne-Marie Duff))
Oblivion (Victoria "Vika" Olsen (Andrea Riseborough))
Old Dogs (Vicki Greer (Kelly Preston))
Out for a Kill (Tommie Ling (Michelle Goh))
The Pianist (Dorota (Emilia Fox))
The Private Lives of Pippa Lee (Sandra Dulles (Winona Ryder))
The Purge: Election Year (Charlene "Charlie" Roan (Elizabeth Mitchell))
Purple Noon (2008 TV Tokyo edition) (Marge Duval (Marie Laforêt))
Ra.One (Sonia (Kareena Kapoor))
Ray (Della Bea Robinson (Kerry Washington))
Red Cliff (Xiao Qiao (Lin Chi-ling))
Reign of Fire (Alex Jensen (Izabella Scorupco))
Reservation Road (Ruth Wheldon (Mira Sorvino))
Resident Evil series (TV editions) (Alice (Milla Jovovich))
Resident Evil: Extinction (Claire Redfield (Ali Larter))
Resident Evil: Afterlife (Claire Redfield (Ali Larter))
Resident Evil: The Final Chapter (Claire Redfield (Ali Larter))
Rush Hour 3 (Geneviève (Noémie Lenoir))
Saw II (Addison (Emmanuelle Vaugier))
Scarface (2004 DVD edition) (Gina Montana (Mary Elizabeth Mastrantonio))
SEAL Team 8: Behind Enemy Lines (Zoe Jelani (Aurélie Meriel))
Shoot 'Em Up (Donna Quintano (Monica Bellucci))
Skyfall (Sévérine (Bérénice Marlohe))
Spider-Man (Mary Jane Watson (Kirsten Dunst))
Spider-Man 2 (Mary Jane Watson (Kirsten Dunst))
Spider-Man 3 (Mary Jane Watson (Kirsten Dunst))
The Spirit (Lorelei Rox (Jaime King))
Star Trek: Enterprise (Hoshi Sato (Linda Park))
Sympathy for Lady Vengeance (Lee Geum-ja (Lee Young-ae))
Terminator 3: Rise of the Machines (T-X (Kristanna Loken))
Tomcats (Officer Natalie Parker (Shannon Elizabeth))
Torque (Shane (Monet Mazur))
Total Recall (Lori Quaid (Kate Beckinsale))
Touching Evil (Detective Susan Branca (Vera Farmiga))
Transporter 2 (Audrey Billings (Amber Valletta))
Triangle (Jess (Melissa George))
Two Weeks Notice (June Carver (Alicia Witt))
Superman (Lois Lane (Margot Kidder))
UC: Undercover (Alex Cross (Vera Farmiga))
Vantage Point (Veronica (Ayelet Zurer))
While We're Young (Cornelia Schrebnick (Naomi Watts))

References

External links
 Official agency profile 
 
 

1971 births
Living people
Japanese video game actresses
Japanese voice actresses
Voice actresses from Tokyo
20th-century Japanese actresses
21st-century Japanese actresses